The 2008 ISSF World Cup was the twenty-third annual edition of the ISSF World Cup in the Olympic shooting events, governed by the International Shooting Sport Federation. Four qualification competitions were held in each event, spanning from March to June, and the best shooters qualified for the ISSF World Cup Final, which was carried out in September in Minsk for the shotgun events, and in November in Bangkok for the other events. Apart from those who qualified through the 2008 World Cup competitions, the defending champions and all medalists from the 2008 Summer Olympics were also invited to the final. The host countries were also granted special wild cards.

Following the tradition of previous Olympic years, one of the qualification competitions was held as a pre-Olympic test event at the Beijing Shooting Range Hall and the Beijing Shooting Range Clay Target Field, the upcoming venues for shooting at the 2008 Summer Olympics. As qualification for the Olympics was concluded with the 2007 season, no quota places were at stake during the 2008 World Cup.

Schedule

Medals by event

Men's rifle events 

1 In the elimination round on May 18,  equalled the world record with a perfect 600.

Men's pistol events

Men's shotgun events

Women's rifle events

Women's pistol events

Women's shotgun events

Multiple winners

Five titles 
  in 50 metre rifle three positions and 10 metre air rifle

Three titles 
  in 25 metre pistol and 10 metre air pistol

Two titles 
  in double trap
  in trap
  in skeet
  in 50 metre pistol and 10 metre air pistol
  in 50 metre pistol and 10 metre air pistol
  in 50 metre rifle prone
  in 25 metre rapid fire pistol
  in 10 metre air rifle

References

External links 
 ISSF calendar for 2008
 Full results at ISSF TV
 Live results for rifle and pistol at Sius

ISSF World Cup
World Cup